Sep. 6 - Eastern Orthodox liturgical calendar - Sep. 8

All fixed commemorations below celebrated on September 20 by Orthodox Churches on the Old Calendar.

For September 7th, Orthodox Churches on the Old Calendar commemorate the Saints listed on August 25.

Feasts

 Forefeast of the Nativity of the Theotokos.

Saints

 Apostles Evodius (Euodias) (66) and Onesiphorus (67), of the Seventy Apostles.
 Martyr Eupsychios of Caesarea in Cappadocia (c. 130)
 Hieromartyr Stephen, Pope of Rome, and Companions (257)
 Martyr Sozon of Cilicia (304)
 Martyr Sozon of Cyprus (7th century)
 Venerable Kassiani the Hymnographer (Kassia), Byzantine Nun, confessor, hymnographer, patron saint of Kasos island (9th century)
 Venerable Peter the Cappadocian, second Abbot of the Monastery of the Deep Stream, in Triglia, near Constantinople (10th century)
 Venerable Luke of Lycaonia, third Abbot of the Monastery of the Deep Stream, in Triglia, near Constantinople (after 975)

Pre-Schism Western saints

 Saint Regina (Reine), a virgin-martyr venerated in Autun in France (c. 286)
 Saint Anastasius the Fuller, martyred by drowning (304)
 Saint Evortius (Euvert), Bishop of Orleans in France (c. 340)
 Saint Pamphilus, a Greek by birth, Bishop of Capua in Italy (c. 400)
 Saint Grimonia (Germana), a holy virgin from Ireland, martyred in Picardy in defence of her virtue (4th century)
 Saint Augustalis (Autal), Bishop of Arles, Confessor (c. 450)
 Saint Memorius (Nemorius, Mesmin) and five Companions, beheaded by Attila the Hun (451)
 Saint Gratus of Aosta, Bishop of Aosta in Italy, of which he is patron-saint (c. 470)
 Saint Carissima, an anchoress in a forest near Albi in France, and then at the convent of Viants (Vious) (5th century)
 Saint Cloud (Clodoald), Abbot and founder of Nogent-sur-Seine Monastery, near Paris (560)
 Saint Balin (Balanus, Balloin) (7th century)
 Saint Madalberta, Abbess of Maubeuge Abbey (706)
 Saint Hilduard (Hilward, Garibald), founder of the monastery of St Peter in Dickelvenne on the Schelde in Belgium (c. 750)
 Saint Alchmund of Hexham, seventh Bishop of Hexham in England (781)
 Saint Tilbert (Gilbert), Bishop of Hexham in Northumbria in England (789)
 Saint Faciolus, a monk at the monastery of St Cyprian in Poitiers in France (c. 950)

Post-Schism Orthodox saints

 Saint John of Novgorod (Ilya), Archbishop and Wonderworker of Novgorod (1186)
 Saints Alexander (Peresvet) and Andrew (Oslyabya), disciples of St. Sergius of Radonezh, who fought at the Battle of Kulikovo (1380)
 Saints Symeon (1476) and Amphilochius (1570), of Pângărați Monastery, Romania.
 Venerable Serapion of Spaso-Eleazar Monastery in Pskov (1480)  (See also: September 8)
 Hieromartyr Macarius of Kanev, Archimandrite, of Obruch and Pinsk (1678)
 Saint Macarius of Optina, Elder of Optina Monastery (1860)
 Venerable Elder Daniel of Katounakia (1929)

New martyrs and confessors

 New Hieromartyrs Peter Sneznitsky and Michael Tikhonitsky, Priests (1918) 
 New Hieromartyr Alexander, Deacon (1918)
 New Hieromartyr John Maslovsky, Priest, of Verkhne-Poltavka, Amur (1921)
 New Hieromartyr Eugene (Zernov), Metropolitan of Nizhny Novgorod (Gorky) (1937)
 New Hieromartyr Leo (Yegorov), Archimandrite, of the St. Alexander Nevsky Lavra (1937)
 New Hieromartyr Nicholas (Ashchepev), Abbot, of the Holy Trinity Selinginsk Monastery (1937)
 New Hieromartyr Eugene (Vyzhva), Abbot, of Zhitomir, Ukraine (1937)
 New Hieromartyr Pachomius (Ionov), Hieromonk of the Holy Trinity Skanov Monastery, Penza (1937)
 New Hieromartyr Stephen (Kreidich), Priest, of Robchik, Bryansk (1937)
 New Hieromartyr Gregory Averin, Priest of Ivanovo (1937)
 New Hieromartyr Basil Sungurov, Priest (1937)

Other commemorations

 Repose of Metropolitan Isidore (Nikolsky) of St. Petersburg (1892)
 Repose of New Hieromartyr Anatole (Kamensky), Archbishop of Irkutsk (1925)

Icon gallery

Notes

References

Sources
 September 7/September 20. Orthodox Calendar (PRAVOSLAVIE.RU).
 September 20 / September 7. HOLY TRINITY RUSSIAN ORTHODOX CHURCH (A parish of the Patriarchate of Moscow).
 September 7. OCA - The Lives of the Saints.
 The Autonomous Orthodox Metropolia of Western Europe and the Americas (ROCOR). St. Hilarion Calendar of Saints for the year of our Lord 2004. St. Hilarion Press (Austin, TX). p. 67.
 The Seventh Day of the Month of September. Orthodoxy in China.
 September 7. Latin Saints of the Orthodox Patriarchate of Rome.
 The Roman Martyrology. Transl. by the Archbishop of Baltimore. Last Edition, According to the Copy Printed at Rome in 1914. Revised Edition, with the Imprimatur of His Eminence Cardinal Gibbons. Baltimore: John Murphy Company, 1916. pp. 274–275.
 Rev. Richard Stanton. A Menology of England and Wales, or, Brief Memorials of the Ancient British and English Saints Arranged According to the Calendar, Together with the Martyrs of the 16th and 17th Centuries. London: Burns & Oates, 1892. pp. 437–440.

 Greek Sources
 Great Synaxaristes:  7 ΣΕΠΤΕΜΒΡΙΟΥ. ΜΕΓΑΣ ΣΥΝΑΞΑΡΙΣΤΗΣ.
  Συναξαριστής. 7 Σεπτεμβρίου. ECCLESIA.GR. (H ΕΚΚΛΗΣΙΑ ΤΗΣ ΕΛΛΑΔΟΣ).
  07/09/. Ορθόδοξος Συναξαριστής.

 Russian Sources
  20 сентября (7 сентября). Православная Энциклопедия под редакцией Патриарха Московского и всея Руси Кирилла (электронная версия). (Orthodox Encyclopedia - Pravenc.ru).
  7 сентября по старому стилю  /  20 сентября по новому стилю. Русская Православная Церковь - Православный церковный календарь на  год.

September in the Eastern Orthodox calendar